Recanati is an Italian town.

Recanati may also refer to:

Locations
Roman Catholic Diocese of Recanati, Roman Catholic diocese in Italy

People
Avraham Rakanti (1888–1980), Greek-Israeli politician, journalist, deputy mayor of Thessaloniki, and member of the first Knesset
Leon Yehuda Recanati (1890–1945), Greek-born Israeli businessman and philanthropist
Leon Recanati (born 1948), Israeli businessman and philanthropist
Menahem Recanati (1223–1290), Italian rabbi
Raphael Recanati (1924–1999), Greek-born Israeli-American businessman, banker and philanthropist
François Recanati (born 1952), French philosopher and linguist
Michael Recanati (1957–2015), American businessman and philanthropist

Other uses
Recanati winery, Israeli winery
Recanati Annunciation, painting
Recanati Polyptych, painting